Sauk-Suiattle, or Sah-Ku-Me-Hu, is a federally recognized Native American tribe in western Washington state in the United States. The tribe historically lived along the banks of the Sauk, Suiattle, Cascade, Stillaguamish, and Skagit rivers, in the area known as Sauk Prairie at the foot of Whitehorse Mountain in the North Cascade Range.

The Sauk-Suiattle Indian Reservation is in this area, centered near the present-day town of Darrington.

History
The Sauk-Suiattle is part of a group of tribes in the area, including the Skagit, who shared similar cultures and languages that were dialects of Lushootseed, of the larger Salishan language family. The Sauk-Suiattle relied heavily on fishing and hunting for their survival and their livelihood, particularly of the migratory salmon, and also mountain goats. Their historic territory was from as far north as the Fraser River, as far south as what nowadays is Highway 2, as far west as the Salish Sea, and east, well in to Eastern Washington. Whitehorse Mountain of the North Cascades. Homestead land where most of the houses were is in Sauk Prairie, there were four(4) houses near what is now Rockport area, and some houses near what is now known as Trafton, near Arlington. A few houses are near what is now known as Granite Falls. They made their livelihood in the mountains and had trading relations with tribes east of the Cascades, as well as making trips downriver to other communities on Puget Sound.

The tribe moved onto a reservation in 1855 after the Point Elliott Treaty was made between Washington Territory and the Native American tribes in the area. A sub-chief signed this treaty after the chief refused to cede historical territory to the European Americans. In 1884, their village at Sauk Prairie, which had eight traditional cedar longhouses was destroyed by Euro-American settlers seeking homestead land. Some tribe members moved to the Swinomish Indian Reservation; like the Tulalip Reservation, it had people from many neighboring Coast Salish tribes.

From an estimated pre-1855 population of 6,000, by 1924 the tribe had declined to only 18 persons. Their land claims, to recover traditional lands, were rejected on the basis that the tribe was not separate from the Upper Skagit.

Government
In 1946, the Sauk-Suiattle established a separate tribal entity; they applied through the administrative process with the Bureau of Indian Affairs (US Department of the Interior) and was federally recognized as a tribe in 1973. Their written constitution was approved by the Secretary of the Interior in 1975.

They elect seven Tribal Council members for three-year terms on an alternating schedule. They also elect the chairman and vice-chairman. Norma A. Joseph was elected chairman of the tribe in 2012.

Since 2021 the Tribal Council has been embroiled in numerous scandals and is most noted for its corruption.

Population and membership
Tribal membership has today risen to about 400. The tribe sets the requirements for membership: individuals seeking to enroll must have at least 1/4 blood descent (equivalent to one grandparent) from one or more Native American ancestors recorded in this valley in the 1942 federal census.

Under the Point Elliot Treaty, the Sauk-Suiattle has fishing rights on the rivers. They are a member of the Skagit River System Cooperative together with the Swinomish.

Tribal enterprises
The tribe operates a smokeshop and a country store through its economic development group. It opened a casino and bingo hall located on State Route 530 in September 2018.  In early 2021 they opened a Marijuana Store.  The casino only last a few months and eventually closed due to mismanagement by the Tribal Gaming Commission as well as the Tribal Council.

Events
The tribe celebrates an annual pow-wow, held in August. It also holds traditional stickgames at the same time.

Language
The Sauk-Suiattle language (Lushootseed) belongs to the Salishan family of Native American languages; dialects of Lushotseed have traditionally been spoken by several Salishan groups. Several of these languages are endangered, as speakers are a decreasing number of elders.

References

Sauk-Suiattle Reservation, Washington, United States Census Bureau

External links
Sauk-Suiattle Indian Tribe, official website

Native American tribes in Washington (state)
Coast Salish governments
Geography of Skagit County, Washington
Geography of Snohomish County, Washington
Federally recognized tribes in the United States